The men's individual trap shooting competition was one of 15 shooting sports events on the Shooting at the 1908 Summer Olympics programme. It was held from 8 to 11 July. Each nation could enter up to 12 shooters. There were 61 competitors from 8 nations. Canada took the top two spots, with Walter Ewing earning gold and George Beattie silver. There were two bronze medals awarded after Alexander Maunder of Great Britain and Anastasios Metaxas tied for third place. The medals were the first in the event for all three nations (France had swept the medals in 1900). Ewing also received Lord Westbury's Cup as a challenge prize.

The weather was bad, with extreme rain and wind as well as low light.

Background

This was the second appearance of what would become standardised as the men's ISSF Olympic trap event. The event was held at every Summer Olympics from 1896 to 1924 (except 1904, when no shooting events were held) and from 1952 to 2016; it was open to women from 1968 to 1996.

Belgium, Canada, Finland, Greece, the Netherlands, and Sweden each made their debut in the event. France and Great Britain both made their second appearance, having competed at the prior edition of the event in 1900.

Competition format

Shooting was conducted in three rounds, with each shooter firing at 30 clay birds in the first round, 20 in the second, and 30 in the third. In the first and second rounds, and for 20 of the birds in the third round, the shooting was on "Team System," meaning that the shooter knew which trap the bird would come from but not the angle; for the final 10 birds of the third round, the shooting was on the "Single Fire" system, with unknown traps and angles. Eliminations took place after each round. These eliminations were supposed to remove half of the competitors between the first and second rounds, and half the remaining between the second and third; but the number of finalists was much greater than one-quarter the number of competitors.

28 shooters advanced to the final round, though 7 did not finish it. The highest possible aggregate score was 80 points.

Records

Prior to this competition, the existing world and Olympic records were as follows. 

Walter Ewing set the initial Olympic record for the 80-shot event with 72 points.

Schedule

Results

The Official Report gives a list of competitors, but gives scores only for those reaching the final round.

Canada objected to the first day of scores and was permitted to re-shoot. John Postans of Great Britain withdrew, with no recorded reason but likely because of that decision; Postans had been tied with Charles Palmer and Bob Hutton for the lead at 23, but Canadian Walter Ewing shot a 27 in the re-shoot.

References

Sources
 
 

Men's trap individual
Trap at the Olympics